Night Electric Night is the third album by Swedish metal band Deathstars. It was released on 30 January 2009 by Nuclear Blast. The album was initially recorded under the working title Deathglam. The album's first single, "Death Dies Hard", made its airplay debut on Stockholm's Bandit Rock 106.3FM. Deathstars have now also put the song "Night Electric Night" on their Myspace page.

Recording 
The album was recorded mostly in a studio in Sweden; however, the album was also recorded in part in New York City. The band completed recording the album at New York in December 2008.

Album title 
Production of the third album by Deathstars was revealed in an interview with the band conducted by Anthony Morgan of Lucem Fero in early 2008, where it was referred to by its working title, Deathglam. Vocalist Whiplasher Bernadotte expanded on the title, saying, ". . . it'll just continue with the deathglam that we play. In terms of this new album's style, I think it's more Deathstars than ever . . ."

Recently, the band has announced on their official website that the record has been re-dubbed Night Electric Night. Whiplasher Bernadotte has stated that this is because calling the album Deathglam would be too "obvious".

Track listing

Personnel 
 Whiplasher Bernadotte – lead vocals
 Nightmare Industries – lead guitar, keyboards
 Cat Casino – rhythm guitar
 Skinny Disco – bass, backing vocals
 Bone W. Machine – drums

Chart positions

References 

2008 albums
Deathstars albums